"Lit" is a song by DJs Steve Aoki and Yellow Claw. It features rapper Gucci Mane and singer T-Pain. It is a single from his 2017 album Kolony.

Background 
The collaboration happened when Aoki facetimed T-Pain who was in Las Vegas, and invited him to go to his house. Aoki then played the beat for T-Pain who then suggested to invite Mane to feature on the song. They then sent the unfinished song to Mane's crew to add his part before sending it to Yellow Claw who completed the track.

Charts

References 

2017 songs
2017 singles
Steve Aoki songs
Yellow Claw (DJs) songs
Gucci Mane songs
T-Pain songs
Trap music (EDM) songs